Anton Aloys Wolf (June 14, 1782 – February 7, 1859) was a Prince-Bishop of Laibach (Ljubljana) during the 19th century.

Biography
Wolf was born in Idrija and baptized Antonius Aloisius. After studying theology in Ljubljana, Anton Wolf became a deacon on September 2, 1804. On December 15, 1804, he was ordained as a priest. In 1807, he became the chancellor of the diocese, and in 1814, the canon of St. Nicholas's Cathedral. On February 27, 1824, the Austrian authorities chose Anton Wolf to head the Ljubljana diocese. On July 12, 1824, Pope Leo XII approved Wolf's appointment, and he was installed as bishop on October 2, 1824. During his term as bishop, Wolf reorganized the Ljubljana diocese. He initiated and financed the publication of a new translation of the Bible in Slovene (1863), a German–Slovene dictionary (1860), and a Slovene–German dictionary. Wolf died on February 7, 1859, in Ljubljana.

Legacy
A street in Ljubljana is named after Anton Wolf.

References

External links

19th-century Roman Catholic bishops in Austria-Hungary
Roman Catholic bishops of Ljubljana
1782 births
1859 deaths